Mohammad Khalil Bandh (born ) is an Indian politician and the former member of Jammu and Kashmir Legislative Assembly. As a MLA, he represented Pulwama assembly constituency thrice in 2002, 2008 and 2014 when he was associated with Jammu and Kashmir People's Democratic Party and subsequently served district president of the party. In 2018, he was appointed as agriculture and production minister by Mehbooba Mufti until PDP-BJP alliance collapsed in 2018.

Later in 2019, he resigned from PDP and made his political associations with the Jammu and Kashmir National Conference after he alleged party's misconduct about its old leaders.

Biography 
He was born to Abdul Gaffar Bandh around 1948 in Pulwama district of Jammu and Kashmir princely state (in modern-day Jammu and Kashmir union territory). He did his matriculation in 1967 from the Jammu and Kashmir State Board of School Education.

Controversies 
He along with other politicians allegedly increased his assets by 9,564% between 2009 and 2014.

References 

1948 births
Living people
Jammu and Kashmir Peoples Democratic Party politicians
Jammu & Kashmir National Conference politicians
People from Pulwama
Jammu and Kashmir MLAs 2002–2008
Jammu and Kashmir MLAs 2008–2014
Jammu and Kashmir MLAs 2014–2018